Crepis setosa, the bristly hawksbeard, is a European species of flowering plant in the family Asteraceae. It has become naturalized in North America and occurs Washington, Oregon, California, Idaho, Montana, Texas, Arkansas, Missouri, Tennessee, Wisconsin, Ohio, Pennsylvania, New York, Connecticut and Vermont.

Crepis setosa grows in forest and areas with disturbance.

References

External links

setosa
Flora of Europe
Plants described in 1797